Thorgrim is an opera in four acts with music by the British composer Frederic H. Cowen to a libretto by Joseph Bennett after the Icelandic tale "Viglund the Fair", first performed at the Drury Lane Theatre, London, on 22 April 1890. The premiere cast included the mezzo-soprano Zélie de Lussan and the tenor Barton McGuckin.

References

Further reading

 Cowen, F. H., My Art and My Friends, London, Arnold, 1913

 Sadie, S. (ed.) (1980) The New Grove Dictionary of Music and Musicians, 5.

External links

English-language operas
Operas
1890 operas
Operas by Frederic H. Cowen
Operas based on fairy tales